"Much Oblige" is a song written by G. Deaton, R. Fulford and G. Simmons. It was originally and released as a duet by American country music artists Jack Greene and Jeannie Seely. Released in 1971, the song became a major hit on the country charts in early 1972.

Background and release
"Much Oblige" was recorded by Greene and Seely at Bradley's Barn, a studio owned by producer Owen Bradley. The track was officially recorded in September 1971 with Bradley producing the record.

"Much Oblige" was released as a single in November 1971 via Decca Records. The song peaked at number 15 on the Billboard Hot Country Singles chart in early 1972. It was later released on their studio album in 1972, Two for the Show.

Track listings
7" vinyl single
 "Much Oblige" – 2:10
 "The First Day" – 2:10

Chart performance

Weekly charts

References

1971 songs
1971 singles
Decca Records singles
Jack Greene songs
Jeannie Seely songs
Song recordings produced by Owen Bradley